United States Senate elections in Wyoming occur when voters in Wyoming select an individual to represent the state in the United States Senate in either of the state's two seats allotted by the U.S. Constitution. Regularly scheduled general elections occur on Election Day, coinciding with various other federal, statewide, and local races.

United States Senate elections in Wyoming
Wyoming